Stolbishchi is a rural locality (a village) in Vorshinskoye Rural Settlement, Sobinsky District, Vladimir Oblast, Russia. The population was 6 as of 2010.

Geography 
Stolbishchi is located on the Vorsha River, 18 km northeast of Sobinka (the district's administrative centre) by road. Dubrovka is the nearest rural locality.

References 

Rural localities in Sobinsky District